South Hanningfield is a small village and civil parish in the Chelmsford district of Essex, England.

The centre of South Hanningfield is situated around the village green, known as the Tye. A village hall is located on the east side of the Tye, while on the west side is a pub, the Old Windmill. There are approximately 69 households in the village. St Peter's Church overlooks the reservoir.

The civil parish includes the larger villages of Ramsden Heath and Downham.

See also
Hanningfield Reservoir
East Hanningfield
West Hanningfield
Lord Hanningfield

References

External links

Villages in Essex